Peter McKenzie may refer to:

Peter McKenzie (actor) (active 1982–2009), New Zealand actor
Peter McKenzie (conservationist) (1952–2012), New Zealand conservationist
Peter H. McKenzie (1845–1929), Canadian politician

See also
Peter Mackenzie (born 1961), American actor